The Quatre études (Four Studies), Op. 7 are a collection of short études for piano by Igor Stravinsky. They were composed between June and July 1908 in Ustilug, Russian Empire. Along with his Piano Sonata in F-sharp minor, the études are one of his major early works for piano.

Structure 

The four movements are listed as:

These four études are focused on difficult and irregular rhythmical structures for pianists, countering tuplets with other rhythmically regular forms or other rhythmical structures that involve certain difficulty for performers. 

The third in E minor, dedicated to Andrey Rimsky-Korsakov, doesn't require much effort or experience in polyrhythm, while the long legato melody is in the middle voice and the accompaniment figures are in the upper registers.

Although much of this music is still derivative of Chopin, Scriabin, and Rachmaninoff, Stravinsky’s own voice asserts itself in the percussive final étude.

References

External links 
 

1908 compositions
Stravinsky
Compositions by Igor Stravinsky
Compositions in C minor
Compositions in D major
Compositions in E minor
Compositions in F-sharp major